The Stade Municipal de la Ville de Differdange or simply Stade Municipal is a stadium in the town of Differdange, Luxembourg. It is one of the home grounds of FC Differdange 03, along with Stade du Thillenberg, and holds 3,500 people.

History
The stadium was constructed between May 2011 and August 2012. It was initially a project to replace Stade Josy Barthel as Luxembourg's new national stadium.

References

Football venues in Luxembourg
Sports venues in Differdange
FC Differdange 03